Yayi may refer to
China-Taiwan Yayi Cup, a Go competition
Thomas Boni Yayi (born 1951), Beninese banker and politician 
Tongo Sarki Yayï, a village in Cameroon